HMS Spartan may refer to one of these vessels of the British Royal Navy named in recognition of the military abilities of the Spartans of ancient Greece.
  was a 38-gun fifth rate launched in 1806 and broken up in 1822
 HMS Spartan was to have been a 46-gun fifth rate; ordered from Plymouth Dockyard in 1824, the ship was cancelled in 1831
  was a 26-gun sixth rate launched in 1841 and sold in 1862
  was an  wooden screw sloop launched in 1868 and sold in 1882
  was a second class cruiser launched in 1891, sent to harbour service in 1907, renamed Defiance in 1921, and sold in 1931
  was a  launched in 1942 and sunk in 1944 by a Hs 293 guided bomb
  is a nuclear-powered  launched in 1978

Battle Honours
 Bay of Naples, 1810
 Burma, 1853
 China, 1856–57
 Atlantic, 1943
 Mediterranean, 1944
 Anzio, 1944
 Falklands, 1982

See also
 

Royal Navy ship names